is a Japanese footballer who plays as a defender for Matsumoto Yamaga FC in the J1 League.

His father Takuya is a former professional footballer, and currently a manager of J2 League side Omiya Ardija.

Career

Montedio Yamagata
Takagi made his official debut for Montedio Yamagata in the J1 League, on 18 March 2015 against Shimizu S-Pulse in ND Soft Stadium Yamagata in Tendō, Japan. He started and played the full match recording a yellow card in the 91st. Takagi and his club won the match 3-1.

Club career statistics
Updated to end of 2018 season.

References

External links 
Profile at Montedio Yamagata

 

1992 births
Living people
Kanagawa University alumni
Association football people from Hiroshima Prefecture
Japanese footballers
J1 League players
J2 League players
Montedio Yamagata players
JEF United Chiba players
Kashiwa Reysol players
Matsumoto Yamaga FC players
Association football defenders